Junior Blue is a Canadian post-rock group, consisting of Justin Peroff and Dylan Hudecki, along with contributions by Peroff's Broken Social Scene bandmates Kevin Drew and Brendan Canning, and Hudecki's By Divine Right bandmates José Miguel Contreras and Brian Borcherdt.

The band released an album, Junior Blue  In the Search of Solid Gold in 2003.

Discography

In the Search of Solid Gold

Track listing

 "Cabs (Day One)" 		- 5:21
 "Jam1"  	- 2:32
 "Complete Breakdown"  	- 2:35
 "Telephone Wires" 	- 2:00
 "She" 	- 4:16
 "Sleeping Through Alarm Clocks" 	- 3:10
 "7:35am" 	- 1:14
 "Gold" 	- 7:56
 "(Untitled)" 	- 1:41
 "(Untitled)" 	- 4:06
 "(Untitled)" 	- 2:10

References 

Musical groups established in 2002
Musical groups from Toronto
Canadian post-rock groups